Senning is a surname. Notable people with the surname include:

Åke Senning (1915–2000), Swedish cardiac surgeon
Senning procedure, an atrial switch heart operation
Daniel Post Senning (born  1978), American etiquette expert
Niels Claussøn Senning ( 1580–1617), Danish/Norwegian Lutheran bishop